The government of South Ossetia issues its own license plates for the vehicles registered on the territory it controls. The design of the plates is based on one of the Soviet standard for license plates (GOST 3207-77).

The license plates are black-on-white. The standard format is four digits followed by Cyrillic letters ЮОР (Юго-Осетинская Республика, Russian for South Ossetian Republic). This system provides just 9,999 possible combinations. Newer system uses format like in Russian license plates: One letter, three digits and two letters with South Ossetian country flag and country code "RSO" in it. Government vehicles uses three digits and three letter format.

On the territory controlled by the government of Georgia the Georgian license plates (until 2008) were used. Since 2004 cars with South Ossetian license plates have not been permitted to enter the territory controlled by the government of Georgia, while the Georgian license plates remain forbidden on the territory of South Ossetia.

External links

Road transport in Georgia (country)
Road transport in South Ossetia
South Ossetia